Mohamed Abdullahi Hassan Noah is a Somali politician. He is the former Minister of Youth and Sports of Somalia, having been appointed to the position on 6 February 2015 by former Prime Minister Omar Abdirashid Ali Sharmarke. He has now been succeeded by Salah Ahmed Jama.

References

Living people
Government ministers of Somalia
Year of birth missing (living people)